Vysočany is a municipality in Blansko District in the South Moravian Region of the Czech Republic. It has about 800 inhabitants.

Administrative parts
The municipality is made up of villages of Housko and Molenburk.

References

Villages in Blansko District